Sportpark Unterhaching, currently known as Alpenbauer Sportpark following a sponsorship deal in 2013, is the home of Munich football club SpVgg Unterhaching. It is used almost exclusively for first-team games and occasionally for reserve-team games. It has a capacity of 15,053 – 6,874 seated and 8,179 standing. The stadium is owned by the town of Unterhaching.

History and development 

With the club  well-established in the 2. Bundesliga, the stadium was constructed in the early 1990s to provide a more suitable home for the team. In 1999, following the unexpected promotion of the team to the Bundesliga, the stadium was expanded and modified to meet the requirements of the German Football Association.

Prior to the stadium expansion, the Sportpark had a capacity of 11,000. The current main stand on the west side of the ground (Haupttribüne, formerly the Westtribüne), with its alpine-style roof, and large parts of the south stand (Südtribüne) were already established, although the current north stand (Nordtribüne) was made up of a few concrete steps and the east stand (Osttribüne) was a grass mound.

Promotion to the Bundesliga in 1999 necessitated improvements in safety, security and capacity, resulting in the current maximum of 15,053.

During first construction phase, prior to season 1999/2000, the capacity of the Nordtribüne – which contains the area for visiting supporters – was significantly increased. In addition, a small standing curve was created in the north-east corner of the stadium. During season 1999/2000, the Nordtribüne was further expanded. After these modifications, the capacity was 10,300; this temporary reduction in capacity was the result of converting standing areas to seating in the Ostribüne.

As a result of the stadium's architecture, development of the Südtribüne (where the clubhouse is situated) and the Haupttribüne (which had an existing roof) was uneconomic. In addition, a VIP house was already situated at the north-west end. Following the successful 1999/2000 season, a curve was constructed between the Südtribüne and Haupttribüne, the Osttribüne was further reinforced and a roof was added, and the Nordtribüne was raised. Following these modifications, the stadium could then fulfill the 15,000 minimum capacity stipulated by the German Football Association.

Outside the stadium, the ground was leveled to create more parking spaces and the combined foot and bicycle lane, running from the stadium to Fasanenpark station, was upgraded. Additional artificial and grass pitches were laid as part of a move to improve training facilities. However, further ground improvements – such as increasing the capacity of the Südtribüne – were quickly shelved, following relegation from the top-flight.

Highlights 

The first game to sell-out at the stadium was the game against VfB Stuttgart in season 1999/2000, attended by 10,300, which ended in a 2–0 victory. Later that season, there were derbies against city rivals 1860 München and FC Bayern. The games were originally planned to take place at the 69,000 capacity Olympic Stadium, until the then-sponsor Erich Lejeune made a compensatory payment, allowing the game to be played at home.

In May 2000, Bayer 04 Leverkusen came to the Sportpark needing to win to clinch the Bundesliga championship on the final day of the season. Haching won the game 2–0, following an own-goal by Michael Ballack and a header by Markus Leitner. Leverkusen's defeat allowed local rivals FC Bayern to win the championship.

Unterhaching had a good home record and defeated both city rivals in 2000/01, along with victories that season against Borussia Dortmund and Hamburger SV.

2008 saw the first international at the Sportpark, when the German women's national team defeated England 3–0 in front of 9,185 spectators. In 2010, the German U-21 team defeated Ukraine 2–1, with two goals from André Schürrle.

Characteristics 

Despite the upgrade, the stadium still has several charming idiosyncrasies, for example the two-storey clubhouse behind the Südtribüne and the players' tunnel that also comes out of the south stand. The stadium also houses a restaurant and an adjoining beer garden. The south-east corner of the ground has parking for the opponent's team bus.

Transport

Public transport 
From central Munich, take S-Bahn S3 to Fasanenpark (in the direction of Deisenhofen or Holzkirchen). The journey by foot is signposted and takes approximately 15 minutes.

By car 
Coming from the south on the A8, exit at Neubiberg and follow the signs to the stadium. From the north on the A99, turn on to the A8 at the München/Brunnthal intersection. Exit at Neubiberg and follow the signs.

External links

 Official website
 Stadium information

Football venues in Germany
SpVgg Unterhaching
Munich (district)
Sports venues in Bavaria